Khonsu is an ancient Egyptian lunar deity.

Khonsu, Khonshu or Khons may refer to:

 Khonsu (TT31), First Prophet of Menkheperre (Thutmose III), during the reign of Ramesses II in the 19th Dynasty
 Temple of Khonsu, Karnak, Luxor, Egypt
 Khonshu (Marvel Comics), a fictional character
 Khonshu (Marvel Cinematic Universe), a fictional character
 Khonsu, a fictional character in Stargate SG-1
 Khonsu, an Endbringer from Worm (web serial)